Scroll of Fire is a monument found in the Jerusalem hills, on the western outskirts of Jerusalem, Israel, and it commemorates Jewish history from The Holocaust until the Independence of Israel from the British. The monument was inaugurated in 1971.

The initiative for the monument came from B'nai B'rith of the United States, and was funded by them. The site was chosen by Yosef Weitz, the director of the Land and Afforestation Department of the Jewish National Fund.

The monument was sculptured by the artist Nathan Rapoport, who is a Holocaust survivor.

The sculpture is made of bronze and is eight meters high. It is in the shape of two scrolls, a gesture to the Jewish nation being the "People of the Book". One of the scrolls describes the Holocaust and the other describes independence.

In the scroll describing the Holocaust, there are sculptured among others Janusz Korczak and his children, a row of helmets symbolizing the Nazi soldiers, a member of The Ghetto Fighters holding a grenade, and other characters behind fences of concentration camps. This scroll ends with holocaust survivors immigrating to Israel in Aliyah Bet, people from Israel helping them get off the boats, and a Jewish man kissing the Land of Israel.

In the scroll describing independence, there are sculptured symbols of Israel, such as: Olive trees, a child holding a cluster of grapes, a man blowing a shofar near the Western Wall, the menorah as described in the Arch of Titus, an old character representing Elijah, people dancing Hora and flags flying near an angel blowing a trumpet.

In the space between the two scrolls, there are two rooms of memorial, and in each one is engraved a quote from the bible.

The monument is found in the Forest of the Martyrs in the Jerusalem hills.

References

External links

 Scroll of Fire at "Gems in Israel".

Monuments and memorials in Israel
Holocaust commemoration
Buildings and structures in Jerusalem District